The iPad 10.2-inch (officially iPad (7th generation)) is a tablet computer developed and marketed by Apple Inc. It features a 10.2-inch Retina display and is powered by the Apple A10 Fusion processor. It is the successor to the 9.7-inch 6th-generation iPad. The device was revealed on September 10, 2019, and released on September 25, 2019.

It has support for the first generation Apple Pencil and has a smart keyboard connector. It is targeted towards the budget and educational markets.

Unlike previous iPad models, which have a 9.7-inch display, the device is the first in the entry-level iPad lineup to feature a larger 10.2-inch display size.

Its successor, the eighth-generation iPad, was revealed on September 15, 2020, and it has replaced this iPad.

History
Rumors centering around a successor to the 2018 iPad began to surface in the first half of 2019, when seven iPad models were registered on the Eurasian Economic Commission, a database known for providing hints about upcoming devices to be released by Apple. One of the models was believed to be a new entry-level iPad, which would allegedly have minor design upgrades as compared to the 2018 iPad. Several sources have claimed that the new model would feature a dual-lens rear camera and that its screen size may measure 10.2 inches, up from the 9.7-inch screen size of previous iPad models. Reports from BGR also claimed that the device could begin its mass production in July 2019, with a predicted release date of around the third quarter of that year.

This iPad was then revealed by Apple on September 10, 2019, the same time as the iPhone 11,11 
Pro And iPhone 11 Pro Max 
at the Steve Jobs Theater with a scheduled release date of September 30 of that year. It was announced to retail at a starting price of $329 in the United States. The iPad was released on the online Apple Store on September 25, 2019.

Significantly, the body dimensions of the 2019 10.2" iPad have been enlarged to match that of the iPad Air (3rd Generation) and the previous generation 10.5" iPad Pro, allowing the Smart Keyboard to be used for all three models. In addition to eliminating recharging and Bluetooth pairing, the direct connection satisfies the education market's requirement for direct connection only during standardized tests. All iPads also retain backwards compatibility with third-party accessory Bluetooth keyboards.

Reception
The 2019 10.2-inch iPad was criticized for the a lack of a processor upgrade over the previous year's 9.7-inch model. However, while the A10 processor itself has not been upgraded to a later processor, the system-on-chip housing the A10 chip in the 2019 10.2-inch iPad has been upgraded to include 3 GB of RAM, 50% more than the previous year's model. Battery life has also been praised for the A10 series.

Timeline of models

Notes

References

9
IOS
Tablet computers
Touchscreen portable media players
Tablet computers introduced in 2019